This is a list of films which have placed number one at the box office in the Australia during 2011. All amounts are in Australian dollars.

See also
 List of Australian films – Australian films by year

References
 Urban Cinefile – Box Office

2011
Australia
2011 in Australian cinema